The Inuit group is a dynamical grouping of the prograde irregular satellites of Saturn which follow similar orbits. Their semi-major axes range between 11 and 18 Gm, their inclinations between 40° and 50°, and their eccentricities between 0.15 and 0.48. They take about 2 years to orbit Saturn.

The International Astronomical Union (IAU) uses names taken from Inuit mythology for these moons.

The group appeared quite homogeneous in early observations, the satellites displaying light-red colour (colour indices B−V = 0.79 and V−R = 0.51, similar to that of the Gallic group) and similar infrared spectra. Recent observations, however, revealed that Ijiraq is distinctly redder than Paaliaq, Siarnaq and Kiviuq. In addition, unlike the other three, Ijiraq's spectrum does not display weak absorption near 0.7 μm. This feature is attributed to a possible water hydration.
 
The spectral homogeneity (with the exception of Ijiraq) is consistent with a common origin in the break-up of a single object but the dispersion of the orbital parameters requires further explanation. Recently reported secular resonances among the members could provide the explanation of the post-collisional dispersion.

Names
The known members of the group are (in order of increasing distance from Saturn):
 S/2019 S 1
 Kiviuq
 Ijiraq
 Paaliaq
 Saturn LX
 S/2004 S 31
 Tarqeq
 Siarnaq

See also
 List of natural satellites

References

External links
Mean orbital parameters: from JPL

 

Inuit group
Moons of Saturn
Irregular satellites
Moons with a prograde orbit